Ambrogi is a surname. Notable people with the surname include:

Arturo Ambrogi (1874–1936), Salvadoran writer and journalist
Domenico Ambrogi ( 1600–after 1678), Italian painter
Marius Ambrogi (1895–1971), French World War I flying ace

See also
Ambrogio